José Fernando Arismendi Peralta (born March 31, 1991) is a professional Uruguayan footballer who currently plays for Everton.

Teams
  Defensor Sporting 2011–2012
  Rampla Juniors 2013
  Rocha 2013–2014
  Sud América 2014–2015
  Cafetaleros de Tapachula 2016
  Celaya 2016
  Cerro 2017
  Delfín 2018
  Everton 2019–present

References

External links

1991 births
Living people
Uruguayan people of Basque descent
Uruguayan footballers
Uruguayan expatriate footballers
Defensor Sporting players
Rampla Juniors players
Sud América players
Club Celaya footballers
Delfín S.C. footballers
Everton de Viña del Mar footballers
Chilean Primera División players
Expatriate footballers in Chile
Expatriate footballers in Mexico
Expatriate footballers in Ecuador
Association football midfielders